The southern banana salamander (Bolitoglossa occidentalis) is a species of salamander in the family Plethodontidae.
It is found in Guatemala, Honduras, and Mexico.
Its natural habitats are subtropical or tropical moist lowland forests, subtropical or tropical moist montane forests, arable land, and plantations .
It is threatened by habitat loss.

References

Bolitoglossa
Taxonomy articles created by Polbot
Amphibians described in 1941